FCCP may be:

 Fellow of the College of Chest Physicians, a Fellow of the American College of Chest Physicians
 Fellow of the American College of Clinical Pharmacy, a Fellow of the American College of Clinical Pharmacy
 Fellow of the Ceylon College of Physicians, a Fellow of the Ceylon College of Physicians, Sri Lanka
 Carbonyl cyanide-p-trifluoromethoxyphenylhydrazone, a hydrazone compound used in biochemistry